Full Speed is a 1996 French drama film directed by Gaël Morel.

Cast 
 Élodie Bouchez - Julie 
 Stéphane Rideau - Jimmy
 Pascal Cervo - Quentin
 Meziane Bardadi - Samir
 Salim Kechiouche - Jamel
 Romain Auger - Rick 
 Mohammed Dib - Karim

References

External links 

1996 drama films
1996 films
French LGBT-related films
LGBT-related drama films

1996 LGBT-related films
1990s French-language films
1990s French films